César Marcelak (5 January 1913 – 17 February 2005) was a French road racing cyclist. In 1952 he won the Grand Prix d'Isbergues. He also rode in the 1948 and 1949 Tour de France.

References

External links

1913 births
2005 deaths
Sportspeople from Mülheim
French male cyclists
Naturalized citizens of France